Bellavista, Italian for "beautiful view", may refer to:

People
 Antonio Bellavista (born 1977), Italian footballer
 Girolamo Bellavista (1908–1976), Italian politician

Places

Andorra
 Hotel Bellavista, a heritage property in Andorra la Vella

Bolivia
 Bellavista Lake

Chile
 Barrio Bellavista, an area of Santiago de Chile
 Bellavista Airport (Chile), an airport in the Maule Region of Chile

Colombia
 Alternative name of Bojayá, a town

Denmark
 Bellavista housing estate, Klampenborg

Ecuador
 Bellavista, Ecuador, a neighborhood of Quito
 Bellavista Cloud Forest Reserve, a conservation area
 Estadio Bellavista, a stadium in Ambato

Italy
 Bellavista, Poggibonsi, a village in the province of Siena, Tuscany
 Bellavista (mountain), a mountain in the Bernina Range between Italy and Switzerland
 Pizzo Bellavista, a mountain in Lombardy
 , a 500-metre wall rock climb on the north face of Cima Ovest, Dolomites

Malta
 Bellavista, an estate in Marsaskala, residence of the Prime Minister

Panama
 Bellavista, Panama City, an area of Panama City

Peru
 Bellavista District, Callao region
 Bellavista de la Unión District, Sechura province
 Bellavista District, Jaén
 Bellavista District, Sullana
 Bellavista Province, San Martín region
 Bellavista District, Bellavista
 Bellavista, Bellavista, capital of the province

Spain
 Bellavista (Franqueses del Vallès, Spain), a neighborhood in Franqueses del Vallès
 Bellavista-La Palmera, a district of Seville
 Bellavista, Seville, a neighborhood

Switzerland
 Bellavista railway station, on the Monte Generoso mountain railway in the canton of Ticino

Other uses
 Club Atlético Bella Vista a football club in Uruguay
 Bellavista (band), American rock band

See also 
 Bela Vista (district of São Paulo), Brazil
 Bella Vista (disambiguation)